Fall on Your Knees is a 1996 novel by Canadian playwright, actor and novelist Ann-Marie MacDonald. The novel takes place in late 19th and early 20th centuries and chronicles four generations of the complex Piper Family. It is a story of "inescapable family bonds, terrible secrets, and of miracles." Beginning in Cape Breton Island, Nova Scotia through the battlefields of World War I and ending in New York City, the troubled Piper sisters depend on one another for survival.

The book was featured by Oprah's Book Club in 2002. As of 2014, it has been published in 23 territories and translated into 19 languages.

Plot summary

At the start of the 20th century, James Piper sets out across Cape Breton Island to find a place to live. Working as a piano tuner, he meets and eventually elopes with 13-year-old Materia Mahmoud, much to the anger of her wealthy, traditional Lebanese parents. Materia gives birth to their first daughter, Kathleen, and James subsequently becomes disgusted with his wife, realizing that he actually married "a child." Materia regrets marrying James, and does not take to her newborn child. James, however, ignores and neglects Materia while spoiling and smothering Kathleen. Materia is taken in by the kind neighbor Mrs. Luvovitz, who teaches her to sew and cook. She grows to hate James and their daughter Kathleen.

Materia senses danger in James' obsession with their daughter and sees it as her duty to keep him distracted and occupied (especially in the bedroom). James eventually impregnates Materia three more times in quick succession. She gives birth to three girls, Mercedes, Frances and Lily, but Lily dies a crib death shortly after. She is from here on in the novel referred to as "Other Lily". The novel then explores the girls' relationship with their troubled father; their secretive, silent mother; and friendships that grow between them as they try to figure out their family's strange and mysterious history. As Kathleen grows older, she is perceived by her schoolmates as snobby, and they turn against her. Her father James is her only friend, and when he travels off to war, Kathleen is crushed.

Kathleen befriends her younger sisters, and James returns from war a shadow of his former self, but still feels an attraction to his eldest daughter. He sends her to New York City to train with a highly-regarded voice instructor and to fulfill her dream of becoming an opera singer at the Metropolitan Opera House. During her absence, James receives a letter from an "Anonymous Well-Wisher" suggesting that Kathleen may have gotten into trouble in New York. He brings her home where it becomes apparent that she is pregnant. Kathleen spends her pregnancy hidden in her family home, and dies giving birth to twins, a boy and a girl. Frances believes the babies must be baptized, and attempts to do so in the creek behind the house the night of their birth. James catches her, and believes she is trying to drown them. He drags her away and the male twin, named Ambrose by Frances, is accidentally left to drown in the creek. The female twin, Lily, contracts polio from the contaminated water in the creek, but survives the disease. Mercedes, Frances and Lily are all raised to believe Materia is Lily's mother. Materia dies and the remaining Piper sisters come to depend on one another for survival.

Frances, beaten and all-but-disowned by her father, causes trouble in school, eventually getting herself expelled, despite Mercedes' best efforts to keep her in check. Frances finds solace in her dolls, matinee movies, her late mother's old hope chest, and her darling younger sister Lily. Frances eventually runs away and ends up in her Lebanese uncle's pub as entertainment and a pint-sized whore. She discovers her long-lost grandfather's house, and then becomes obsessed with his African maid, Teresa. She stalks and seduces Teresa's brother, Leo, and becomes impregnated by him. She dreams of becoming a mother to a black child, but her son, Aloysius, is pronounced dead at birth and she becomes depressed. After this trauma, Frances and her father slowly reconcile and she even becomes something akin to a confessor for him before he dies years later.

Lily, crippled by the polio she contracted, wears a leather brace. She loves Frances the most of everyone. Lily believes everything Frances tells her, and so believes Ambrose is her guardian angel, and often wishes for him to protect Frances after she left the house.

Mercedes spends her time praying, taking care of the family and working hard at school. She flirts with the idea of a romance with the son of Mrs. Luvovitz, but drags her feet because his Jewish ancestry conflicts with her growing religious devotion and sense of propriety. James, who has become a moonshiner as his primary income source, suffers a severe stroke and Mercedes is slowly consumed by her role as care-taker in the family, becoming severe and controlling as she gives up on any life for herself outside of this role. This culminates in her deception involving Frances' illegitimate mixed-race child: who was in fact given up for adoption by his disapproving aunt. As Frances and their father grow closer in his old age, Mercedes resents their bond, feeling left out and snubbed after all the sacrifices she has made for her family.

Kathleen's diary and old dress is sent home by her caretaker in New York, and after Frances reads it, sends it with Lily to New York, to find Kathleen's lover. As Lily reads through the pages of the diary, we learn of Kathleen's vocal lessons, her instructor she calls the Kaiser, and her illicit love affair with the female black piano accompanist, Rose Lacroix. The romance is a whirlwind, as both women fall madly in love with one another, going to jazz bars with Rose dressed as a man. James barges into Kathleen's apartment one day to find her in bed with Rose (whom he mistakes for a man). A furious attack on Rose leads to James' jealous rape of Kathleen, as his sexual desire for her finally overcomes him. This reveals Lily's true father. James eventually confesses everything to Frances, and soon after dies in his reading chair, peacefully. Frances finally reveals the family's darkest secrets to her sister Mercedes, who is firmly in denial. Frances dies as an elderly woman with the help of Mercedes, without ever knowing the actual fate of her child.

The novel ends in New York, as Lily makes her way to Rose's apartment. The two form a friendship and live together for many years, eventually visited by a young black man called Anthony, bearing a gift from Mercedes Piper. He delivers a drawing of a family tree, made by Mercedes, finally revealing all the incest, illegitimate children, crib deaths and affairs that make up the Piper family. Anthony is revealed to be Frances' long-lost son Aloysius, and Lily sits him down to tell him all about his mother.

Awards and honors 
For Fall on Your Knees, MacDonald won the 1997 Commonwealth Writers Prize for Best First Book.

Also in 1997, the book won the Canadian Authors Association Award for Fiction.

It won the Canadian Booksellers Association's Libris Award (date of award unknown).

The novel was shortlisted for the Giller Prize in 1996.

It was selected for Oprah's Book Club in 2002 and was chosen for the Amnesty International Book Club for July/August 2014.

Adaptations 
Nimble Productions purchased the rights to the work for a limited-series TV program in 2014. 

Alisa Palmer and Hannah Moscovitch adapted Fall on Your Knees for the stage. This adaptation premiered in Toronto in January 2023 as a National Arts Centre, Vita Brevis Arts, Canadian Stage, Neptune Theatre, and Grand Theatre joint production. It is set to tour after the Toronto run.

Further reading 
 Georgis, Dina. "Falling for Jazz: Desire, Dissonance, and Racial Collaboration." Canadian Review of American Studies, Volume 35, Number 2 (2005): 215-229. Web. 24 Oct. 2011.
 Parro, Gabriella. "Who’s Your Father, Dear? Haunted Bloodlines and Miscegenation in Ann-Marie MacDonald’s Fall on Your Knees." Canadian Review of American Studies, Volume 35, Number 2 (2005): 177-193. Web. 24 Oct. 2011.
 Gordon, Neta. "Twin Tales: Narrative Profusion and Genealogy in Fall on Your Knees." Canadian Review of American Studies, Volume 35, Number 2 (2005): 159-176. Web. 24, Oct. 2011.

References

External links
 Ann-Marie MacDonald official website
 Publisher's official website
 Interview with MacDonald about the book on Oprah.com
 Highlights of Oprah's Book Club discussion

1996 Canadian novels
Novels by Ann-Marie MacDonald
Family saga novels
Alfred A. Knopf books
Novels set in Nova Scotia
Novels set in New York City